The O. Winston Link Museum is a museum dedicated to the photography of O. Winston Link, the twentieth century railroad photographer widely considered the master of the juxtaposition between steam railroading and rural culture. He is most noted for his 1950's photographs of steam locomotives taken at night, lit by numerous  flashbulbs.  He carefully planned the lighting and the staging of these photos, placing human subjects in many.

In downtown Roanoke, Virginia, the museum is in a restored Norfolk & Western Railway passenger train station. It opened in January 2004. The building is included in the Norfolk and Western Railway Company Historic District, listed on the National Register of Historic Places in 1999.

It currently displays hundreds of photographic prints and has several interactive displays including audio that provide information on Link's photographic subjects. Also displayed are some of the equipment that Link employed to create his night time photographs.

See also
 List of museums devoted to one photographer

References

External links
 
 "Linked up: Museum adds sparkle to Star City"
 O. Winston Link Museum

Art museums established in 2004
Railroad museums in Virginia
Art museums and galleries in Virginia
Museums in Roanoke, Virginia
Link
Photography museums and galleries in the United States
2004 establishments in Virginia